Hranitne is an urban-type settlement in Korosten Raion, Zhytomyr Oblast, Ukraine. It is located in an area containing reserves of granite, which provides Hranitne with an economy based on extraction and crushing of the stone for building use. Population:  In 2001, population was 1,631.

References

Urban-type settlements in Korosten Raion